This is a list of the Turkey national football team results from 1923 to 1960.

1920s

1930s

1940s

1950-1954

1955-1960

Other unofficial games

Notes

Turkey national football team results